

Major current manufacturers

Current and defunct automobile manufacturers of Sweden

 Allvelo (1903–1907)
 AB Nyköpings Automobilfabrik (assembly, 1937–1960)
 AB Thulinverken (1920–1928)
 AMG (1903–1906)
 Arlöfs (in or around 1902)
 Åtvidaberg (1910–1911)
 Boes Motor & Mekanik (unknown)
 Caresto (2004–present)
 Esther (1987–present)
 Fram King Fulda (1957–1962)
 GEA (one in 1905)
 HB (in or around 1925)
 Hult Healey (1984–1990)
 Husqvarna (one in 1943)
 Jösse Car (1994–2000)
 Kalmar (1969–1971)
 LT (in 1909 and in 1923)
 Lidköpings Mekaniska Verkstads (one in 1923)
 Mania Spyder (unknown)
 Mascot (around 1920)
 OBC (one in 1974)
 Racing Plast Burträsk (1965–1971)
 Reva (1964–1968)
 Rengsjöbilen (1914–1916)
 Saab (1947–2014)
 Self (1916–1922)
 SAF (1919–1921)
 Scania (1903–1911)
 Svensk Elektrobil (around 1945)
 Söderbloms Gjuteri & Mekaniska Verkstad (1901–unknown)
 Södertelje Verkstäder (1901–1906)
 Tidaholm (1903–ca. 1932)
 UNO (around 1990)
 Vabis (1897–1911)
 Von Braun Holding Company (2014–present)

See also
List of automobile manufacturers
List of car brands
List of motorcycle manufacturers
List of truck manufacturers

 
Lists of automobile manufacturers
Cars
Automobile manuf

uk:Список автовиробників Швеції